This page lists all described species of the spider family Lamponidae accepted by the World Spider Catalog :

A

Asadipus

Asadipus Simon, 1897
 A. areyonga Platnick, 2000 — Australia (Northern Territory, Queensland)
 A. auld Platnick, 2000 — Australia (Western Australia, South Australia)
 A. banjiwarn Platnick, 2000 — Australia (Western Australia)
 A. baranar Platnick, 2000 — Australia (Western Australia)
 A. barant Platnick, 2000 — Australia (Western Australia)
 A. barlee Platnick, 2000 — Australia (Western Australia)
 A. bucks Platnick, 2000 — Australia (South Australia, Victoria)
 A. cape Platnick, 2000 — Australia (Western Australia)
 A. croydon Platnick, 2000 — Australia (Queensland)
 A. humptydoo Platnick, 2000 — Australia (Northern Territory)
 A. insolens (Simon, 1896) (type) — Australia (Queensland)
 A. julia Platnick, 2000 — Australia (Northern Territory, Queensland)
 A. kunderang Platnick, 2000 — Australia
 A. longforest Platnick, 2000 — Australia (South Australia, Victoria, Tasmania)
 A. mountant Platnick, 2000 — Australia (Western Australia)
 A. palmerston Platnick, 2000 — Australia (Northern Territory)
 A. phaleratus (Simon, 1909) — Australia (Western Australia, South Australia, Queensland)
 A. uphill Platnick, 2000 — Australia (Queensland)
 A. woodleigh Platnick, 2000 — Australia (Western Australia)
 A. yundamindra Platnick, 2000 — Australia (Western Australia)

B

Bigenditia

Bigenditia Platnick, 2000
 B. millawa Platnick, 2000 — Eastern Australia
 B. zuytdorp Platnick, 2000 (type) — Australia (Western Australia, South Australia)

C

Centrocalia

Centrocalia Platnick, 2000
 C. chazeaui Platnick, 2000 (type) — New Caledonia
 C. lifoui (Berland, 1929) — New Caledonia, Loyalty Is.
 C. ningua Platnick, 2000 — New Caledonia

Centroina

Centroina Platnick, 2002
 C. blundells (Platnick, 2000) — Australian Capital Territory
 C. bondi (Platnick, 2000) — Australian Capital Territory, Victoria
 C. dorrigo (Platnick, 2000) — Australia (New South Wales)
 C. enfield (Platnick, 2000) — Australia (New South Wales)
 C. keira (Platnick, 2000) (type) — Australia (New South Wales)
 C. kota (Platnick, 2000) — Australia (New South Wales)
 C. lewis (Platnick, 2000) — Australia (Queensland)
 C. macedon (Platnick, 2000) — Australia (New South Wales, Victoria)
 C. sawpit (Platnick, 2000) — Australia (New South Wales, Victoria)
 C. sherbrook (Platnick, 2000) — Australia (Victoria)
 C. whian (Platnick, 2000) — Australia (New South Wales)

Centrothele

Centrothele L. Koch, 1873
 C. cardell Platnick, 2000 — Australia (Queensland)
 C. coalston Platnick, 2000 — Australia (Queensland)
 C. fisher Platnick, 2000 — Australia (Queensland)
 C. gordon Platnick, 2000 — Australia (Queensland, New South Wales)
 C. kuranda Platnick, 2000 — Australia (Queensland)
 C. lorata L. Koch, 1873 (type) — Australia (Queensland)
 C. mossman Platnick, 2000 — Australia (Queensland)
 C. mutica (Simon, 1897) — Australia (Queensland, New South Wales), New Guinea
 C. nardi Platnick, 2000 — Australia (Queensland, New South Wales)
 C. spurgeon Platnick, 2000 — Australia (Queensland)

Centsymplia

Centsymplia Platnick, 2000
 C. glorious Platnick, 2000 (type) — Australia (Queensland, New South Wales)

G

Graycassis

Graycassis Platnick, 2000
 G. barrington Platnick, 2000 — Australia (New South Wales)
 G. boss Platnick, 2000 — Australia (New South Wales)
 G. bruxner Platnick, 2000 — Australia (New South Wales)
 G. bulga Platnick, 2000 — Australia (New South Wales)
 G. chichester Platnick, 2000 — Australia (Queensland, New South Wales)
 G. dorrigo Platnick, 2000 — Australia (New South Wales)
 G. enfield Platnick, 2000 — Australia (New South Wales)
 G. marengo Platnick, 2000 (type) — Australia (New South Wales)
 G. scrub Platnick, 2000 — Australia (New South Wales)
 G. styx Platnick, 2000 — Australia (New South Wales)

L

Lampona

Lampona Thorell, 1869
 L. airlie Platnick, 2000 — Australia (Queensland)
 L. allyn Platnick, 2000 — Australia (New South Wales)
 L. ampeinna Platnick, 2000 — Australia (Western Australia, central Australia)
 L. barrow Platnick, 2000 — Australia (Western Australia)
 L. braemar Platnick, 2000 — Eastern Australia, Tasmania
 L. brevipes L. Koch, 1872 — Australia (Western Australia)
 L. bunya Platnick, 2000 — Australia (Queensland)
 L. carlisle Platnick, 2000 — Australia (Queensland)
 L. chalmers Platnick, 2000 — Australia (Queensland)
 L. chinghee Platnick, 2000 — Australia (Queensland, New South Wales)
 L. cohuna Platnick, 2000 — Australia (South Australia, Victoria)
 L. cudgen Platnick, 2000 — Australia (Queensland, New South Wales, Victoria)
 L. cumberland Platnick, 2000 — Australia (Victoria)
 L. cylindrata (L. Koch, 1866) (type) — Australia. Introduced to New Zealand
 L. danggali Platnick, 2000 — Central, Eastern Australia
 L. davies Platnick, 2000 — Australia (Queensland)
 L. dwellingup Platnick, 2000 — Australia (Western Australia)
 L. eba Platnick, 2000 — Australia (South Australia)
 L. ewens Platnick, 2000 — Australia (South Australia, Tasmania)
 L. fife Platnick, 2000 — Australia (New South Wales, Victoria)
 L. finke Platnick, 2000 — Australia (Northern Territory, South Australia)
 L. finnigan Platnick, 2000 — Australia (Queensland)
 L. flavipes L. Koch, 1872 — Central, Eastern Australia
 L. foliifera Simon, 1908 — Australia (Western Australia, central Australia)
 L. garnet Platnick, 2000 — Australia (Queensland)
 L. gilles Platnick, 2000 — Australia (South Australia)
 L. gosford Platnick, 2000 — Australia (New South Wales, Victoria)
 L. hickmani Platnick, 2000 — Australia (Tasmania)
 L. hirsti Platnick, 2000 — Australia (South Australia)
 L. kapalga Platnick, 2000 — Australia (Northern Territory, Queensland)
 L. kirrama Platnick, 2000 — Australia (Queensland)
 L. lamington Platnick, 2000 — Australia (Queensland)
 L. lomond Platnick, 2000 — Southeastern Australia, Tasmania
 L. macilenta L. Koch, 1873 — Southern Australia
 L. mildura Platnick, 2000 — Australia (New South Wales, Victoria)
 L. molloy Platnick, 2000 — Australia (Queensland)
 L. monteithi Platnick, 2000 — Australia (Queensland)
 L. moorilyanna Platnick, 2000 — Australia (Queensland, South Australia)
 L. murina L. Koch, 1873 — Australia. Introduced to New Zealand
 L. olga Platnick, 2000 — Australia (Northern Territory)
 L. ooldea Platnick, 2000 — Australia (South Australia, Victoria)
 L. papua Platnick, 2000 — New Guinea
 L. punctigera Simon, 1908 — Southern Australia
 L. pusilla L. Koch, 1873 — Eastern Australia
 L. quinqueplagiata Simon, 1908 — Australia (Western Australia)
 L. ruida L. Koch, 1873 — Eastern Australia, Tasmania
 L. russell Platnick, 2000 — Australia (Queensland)
 L. spec Platnick, 2000 — Australia (Queensland)
 L. superbus Platnick, 2000 — Australia (Queensland)
 L. talbingo Platnick, 2000 — Southeastern Australia
 L. taroom Platnick, 2000 — Australia (Queensland)
 L. terrors Platnick, 2000 — Australia (Queensland)
 L. torbay Platnick, 2000 — Australia (Western Australia)
 L. tulley Platnick, 2000 — Australia (Queensland)
 L. walsh Platnick, 2000 — Australia (Western Australia)
 L. whaleback Platnick, 2000 — Australia (Western Australia)
 L. yanchep Platnick, 2000 — Australia (Western Australia)

Lamponata

Lamponata Platnick, 2000
 L. daviesae Platnick, 2000 (type) — Australia

Lamponega

Lamponega Platnick, 2000
 L. arcoona Platnick, 2000 (type) — Southern Australia
 L. forceps Platnick, 2000 — Australia (Western Australia)
 L. serpentine Platnick, 2000 — Australia (South Australia)

Lamponella

Lamponella Platnick, 2000
 L. ainslie Platnick, 2000 (type) — Southern Australia, Tasmania
 L. beaury Platnick, 2000 — Australia (Queensland, New South Wales)
 L. brookfield Platnick, 2000 — Australia (Queensland)
 L. homevale Platnick, 2000 — Australia (Queensland)
 L. kanangra Platnick, 2000 — Australia (New South Wales)
 L. kimba Platnick, 2000 — Australia (Western Australia, South Australia)
 L. kroombit Platnick, 2000 — Australia (Queensland)
 L. taroom Platnick, 2000 — Australia (Queensland)
 L. wombat Platnick, 2000 — Australian Capital Territory
 L. wyandotte Platnick, 2000 — Australia (Queensland)

Lamponicta

Lamponicta Platnick, 2000
 L. cobon Platnick, 2000 (type) — Australia (New South Wales, Victoria)

Lamponina

Lamponina Strand, 1913
 L. asperrima (Hickman, 1950) — Australia (South Australia)
 L. elongata Platnick, 2000 — Southern Australia
 L. isa Platnick, 2000 — Australia (Northern Territory, Queensland)
 L. kakadu Platnick, 2000 — Australia (Northern Territory)
 L. loftia Platnick, 2000 — Australia (South Australia, Victoria)
 L. scutata (Strand, 1913) (type) — Australia

Lamponoides

Lamponoides Platnick, 2000
 L. coottha Platnick, 2000 (type) — Australia (Queensland, New South Wales)

Lamponova

Lamponova Platnick, 2000
 L. wau Platnick, 2000 (type) — New Guinea, Australia (New South Wales, Victoria)

Lamponusa

Lamponusa Platnick, 2000
 L. gleneagle Platnick, 2000 (type) — Australia (Western Australia)

Longepi

Longepi Platnick, 2000
 L. barmah Platnick, 2000 — Eastern Australia
 L. bondi Platnick, 2000 — Australia (New South Wales, Victoria)
 L. boyd Platnick, 2000 (type) — Australia (New South Wales, Australian Capital Territory)
 L. canungra Platnick, 2000 — Australia (Queensland)
 L. cobon Platnick, 2000 — Australia (Victoria)
 L. durin Platnick, 2000 — Australia (Western Australia)
 L. tarra Platnick, 2000 — Australia (Victoria)
 L. woodman Platnick, 2000 — Southern Australia

N

Notsodipus

Notsodipus Platnick, 2000
 N. barlee Platnick, 2000 — Australia (Western Australia)
 N. bidgemia Platnick, 2000 — Australia (Western Australia)
 N. blackall Platnick, 2000 — Australia (Queensland)
 N. broadwater Platnick, 2000 — Australia (Queensland)
 N. capensis Platnick, 2000 — Australia (Western Australia)
 N. dalby Platnick, 2000 (type) — Eastern Australia
 N. domain Platnick, 2000 — Southern Australia, Tasmania
 N. innot Platnick, 2000 — Australia (Queensland)
 N. keilira Platnick, 2000 — Australia (South Australia, Victoria)
 N. linnaei Platnick & Dupérré, 2008 — Australia (Western Australia)
 N. magdala Platnick, 2000 — Australia (Northern Territory)
 N. marun Platnick, 2000 — Australia (Western Australia, Northern Territory, Queensland)
 N. meedo Platnick, 2000 — Australia (Western Australia)
 N. muckera Platnick, 2000 — Southern Australia
 N. quobba Platnick, 2000 — Australia (Western Australia)
 N. renmark Platnick, 2000 — Australia (South Australia, Victoria)
 N. upstart Platnick, 2000 — Australia (Queensland)
 N. visio Platnick, 2000 — Australia (Western Australia, South Australia)

P

Paralampona

Paralampona Platnick, 2000
 P. aurumagua Platnick, 2000 — Australia (Queensland)
 P. cobon Platnick, 2000 — Australia (Victoria)
 P. domain Platnick, 2000 (type) — Southeastern Australia, Tasmania
 P. kiola Platnick, 2000 — Australia (New South Wales, Australian Capital Territory)
 P. marangaroo Platnick, 2000 — Australia (Western Australia)
 P. renmark Platnick, 2000 — Australia (South Australia, New South Wales)
 P. sherlock Platnick, 2000 — Southeastern Australia
 P. wogwog Platnick, 2000 — Australia (New South Wales)

Platylampona

Platylampona Platnick, 2004
 P. mazeppa Platnick, 2004 (type) — Australia (Queensland, New South Wales)

Prionosternum

Prionosternum Dunn, 1951
 P. nitidiceps (Simon, 1909) — Southern Australia, Tasmania
 P. porongurup Platnick, 2000 — Australia (Western Australia)
 P. scutatum Dunn, 1951 (type) — Australia (Western Australia)

Pseudolampona

Pseudolampona Platnick, 2000
 P. binnowee Platnick, 2000 — Australia (New South Wales)
 P. boree Platnick, 2000 — Southern Australia
 P. emmett Platnick, 2000 — Australia (Queensland)
 P. glenmore Platnick, 2000 — Australia (Queensland)
 P. jarrahdale Platnick, 2000 — Australia (Western Australia)
 P. kroombit Platnick, 2000 — Australia (Queensland)
 P. marun Platnick, 2000 — Australia (Western Australia)
 P. spurgeon Platnick, 2000 — Australia (Queensland)
 P. taroom Platnick, 2000 — Australia (Queensland, New South Wales)
 P. warrandyte Platnick, 2000 (type) — Southeastern Australia
 P. woodman Platnick, 2000 — Australia (Western Australia)
 P. wyandotte Platnick, 2000 — Australia (Queensland)

Q

Queenvic

Queenvic Platnick, 2000
 Q. goanna Platnick, 2000 — Australia (Queensland, New South Wales)
 Q. kelty Platnick, 2000 — Australia (South Australia, Victoria)
 Q. mackay Platnick, 2000 (type) — Eastern Australia
 Q. piccadilly Platnick, 2000 — Southeastern Australia

References

Lamponidae